The Eurovision Song Contest, sometimes abbreviated to ESC and often known simply as Eurovision, is an international song competition organised annually by the European Broadcasting Union (EBU), featuring participants representing primarily European countries. Each participating country submits an original song to be performed on live television and radio, transmitted to national broadcasters via the EBU's Eurovision and Euroradio networks, with competing countries then casting votes for the other countries' songs to determine a winner.

Based on the Sanremo Music Festival held in Italy since 1951, Eurovision has been held annually since 1956 (apart from ), making it the longest-running annual international televised music competition and one of the world's longest-running television programmes. Active members of the EBU, as well as invited associate members, are eligible to compete, and  52 countries have participated at least once. Each participating broadcaster sends one original song of three minutes duration or less to be performed live by a singer or group of up to six people aged 16 or older. Each country awards 1–8, 10 and 12 points to their ten favourite songs, based on the views of an assembled group of music professionals and the country's viewing public, with the song receiving the most points declared the winner. Other performances feature alongside the competition, including a specially-commissioned opening and interval act and guest performances by musicians and other personalities, with past acts including Cirque du Soleil, Madonna and the first performance of Riverdance. Originally consisting of a single evening event, the contest has expanded as new countries joined (including countries outside of Europe, such as ), leading to the introduction of relegation procedures in the 1990s, and eventually the creation of semi-finals in the 2000s.   has competed more times than any other country, having participated in all but one edition, while  holds the record for the most victories, with seven wins in total.

Traditionally held in the country which won the preceding year's event, the contest provides an opportunity to promote the host country and city as a tourist destination. Thousands of spectators attend each year, and journalists are present to cover all aspects of the contest, including rehearsals in venue, press conferences with the competing acts, and other related events and performances in the host city. Alongside the generic Eurovision logo, a unique theme and slogan is typically developed for each event. The contest has aired in countries across all continents, and has been available online via the official Eurovision website since 2001. Eurovision ranks among the world's most watched non-sporting events every year, with hundreds of millions of viewers globally, and performing at the contest has often provided artists with a local career boost and in some cases long-lasting international success. Several of the best-selling music artists in the world have competed in past editions, including ABBA, Celine Dion, Julio Iglesias, Cliff Richard and Olivia Newton-John, and some of the world's best-selling singles have received their first international performance on the Eurovision stage.

While having gained popularity with the viewing public in both participating and non-participating countries, the contest has also been the subject of criticism for its artistic quality as well as a perceived political aspect to the event. Concerns have been raised regarding political friendships and rivalries between countries potentially having an impact on the results. Controversial moments have included participating countries withdrawing at a late stage, censorship of broadcast segments by broadcasters, and political events impacting participation. Likewise, the contest has also been criticised for an over-abundance of elaborate stage shows at the cost of artistic merit. Eurovision has, however, gained popularity for its kitsch appeal, its musical span of ethnic and international styles, as well as emergence as part of LGBT culture, resulting in a large, active fanbase and an influence on popular culture. The popularity of the contest has led to the creation of several similar events, either organised by the EBU or created by external organisations, and several special events have been organised by the EBU to celebrate select anniversaries or as a replacement due to cancellation.

Origins and history 

The Eurovision Song Contest's founding stemmed from a desire to promote cooperation between European countries in the years following the Second World War through cross-border television broadcasts, which gave rise to the founding of the European Broadcasting Union (EBU) in 1950. The word "Eurovision" was first used by British journalist George Campey in the London Evening Standard in 1951, when he referred to a BBC programme being relayed by Dutch television. Following several events broadcast internationally via the Eurovision transmission network in the early 1950s, including the Coronation of Elizabeth II in 1953, an EBU committee, headed by Marcel Bezençon, was formed in January 1955 to investigate new initiatives for cooperation between broadcasters, which approved for further study a European song competition from an idea initially proposed by RAI manager Sergio Pugliese. The EBU's general assembly agreed to the organising of the song contest in October 1955, under the initial title of the European Grand Prix, and accepted a proposal by the Swiss delegation to host the event in Lugano in the spring of 1956. The Italian Sanremo Music Festival, held since 1951, was used as a basis for the initial planning of the contest, with several amendments and additions given its international nature.

The winning song was "Refrain", representing the host country Switzerland and performed by Lys Assia. Voting during the first contest was held behind closed doors, with only the winner being announced on stage; the use of a scoreboard and public announcement of the voting, inspired by the BBC's Festival of British Popular Songs, has been used since 1957. The tradition of the winning country hosting the following year's contest, which has since become a standard feature of the event, began in 1958. Broadcasts in widescreen began in 2005 and in high-definition since 2007, with ultra-high-definition tested for the first time in 2022.

By the 1960s, between 16 and 18 countries were regularly competing each year. Countries from outside the traditional boundaries of Europe began entering the contest, and countries in Western Asia and North Africa started competing in the 1970s and 1980s. Changes in Europe following the end of the Cold War saw an influx of new countries from Central and Eastern Europe applying for the first time. The  included a separate pre-qualifying round for seven of these new countries, and from  relegation systems were introduced to manage the number of competing entries, with the poorest performing countries barred from entering the following year's contest. From 2004 the contest expanded to become a multi-programme event, with a semi-final at the  allowing all interested countries to compete each year; a second semi-final was added to each edition from 2008.

66 contests have been held  making Eurovision the longest-running annual international televised music competition as determined by Guinness World Records. The contest has been listed as one of the longest-running television programmes in the world and among the world's most watched non-sporting events. Australia became the first non-EBU member country to compete following an invitation by the EBU ahead of the contest's  in 2015; initially announced as a "one-off" for the anniversary edition, the country was invited back the following year and has subsequently secured participation rights until 2023.

Eurovision had been held every year until 2020, when  was cancelled in response to the COVID-19 pandemic. No competitive event was able to take place due to uncertainty caused by the spread of the virus in Europe and the various restrictions imposed by the governments of the participating countries. In its place a special broadcast, Eurovision: Europe Shine a Light, was produced by the organisers, which honoured the songs and artists that would have competed in 2020 in a non-competitive format.

Naming 
Over the years the name used to describe the contest, and used on the official logo for each edition, has evolved. The contest's official brand guidance specifies that translations of the name may be used depending on national tradition and brand recognition in the competing countries, but that the official name Eurovision Song Contest is always preferred; the contest is commonly referred to in English by the abbreviation "Eurovision", and in internal documents by the acronym "ESC".

Format 
Original songs representing participating countries are performed in a live television programme broadcast via the Eurovision and Euroradio networks simultaneously to all countries. A "country" as a participant is represented by one television broadcaster from that country, a member of the European Broadcasting Union, and is typically that country's national public broadcasting organisation. The programme is staged by one of the participant countries and is broadcast from an auditorium in the selected host city. Since 2008, each contest is typically formed of three live television shows held over one week: two semi-finals are held on the Tuesday and Thursday, followed by a final on the Saturday. The remaining countries are split between the two semi-finals, and the 10 highest-scoring entries in each qualify to produce 26 countries competing in the final.

Each show typically begins with an opening act consisting of music and/or dance performances by invited artists, which contributes to a unique theme and identity created for that year's event; since 2013 the opening of the contest's final has included a "Flag Parade", with competing artists entering the stage behind their country's flag in a similar manner to the procession of competing athletes at the Olympic Games opening ceremony. Viewers are welcomed by one or more presenters who provide key updates during the show, conduct interviews with competing acts from the green room, and guide the voting procedure in English and French. Competing acts perform sequentially, and after all songs have been performed viewers are invited to vote for their favourite performances—except for the performance of their own country—via telephone, SMS and the official Eurovision app. The public vote comprises 50% of the final result alongside the views of a jury of music industry professionals from each country. An interval act is invariably featured during this voting period, which on several occasions has included a well-known personality from the host country or an internationally recognised figure. The results of the voting are subsequently announced; in the semi-finals the 10 highest-ranked countries are announced in a random order, with the full results undisclosed. In the final the presenters call upon a representative spokesperson for each country in turn who announces their jury's points, while the results of the public vote are subsequently announced by the presenters. The qualifying acts in the semi-finals, and the winning delegation in the final are invited back on stage, and in the final a trophy is awarded to the winning performers and songwriters with the previous year's winner presenting the trophy followed by a reprise of the winning song. The full results of the competition, including detailed results of the jury and public vote, are released online shortly after the final, and the participating broadcaster of the winning entry is traditionally given the honour of organising the following year's event.

Selection

Each participating broadcaster has sole discretion over the process they may employ to select their entry for the contest. Typical methods in which participants are selected include a televised national selection process using a public vote; an internal selection by a committee appointed by the broadcaster; and through a mixed format where some decisions are made internally and the public are engaged in others. Among the most successful televised selection shows is Sweden's Melodifestivalen, first established in 1959 and now one of Sweden's most watched TV shows each year.

Participation 

Active members (as opposed to associate members) of the European Broadcasting Union are eligible to participate; active members are those who are located in states that fall within the European Broadcasting Area, or are member states of the Council of Europe. Active members include media organisations whose broadcasts are often made available to at least 98% of households in their own country which are equipped to receive such transmissions. Associate member broadcasters may be eligible to compete, dependent on approval by the contest's Reference Group.

The European Broadcasting Area is defined by the International Telecommunication Union as encompassing the geographical area between the boundary of ITU Region 1 in the west, the meridian 40° East of Greenwich in the east, and parallel 30° North in the south. Armenia, Azerbaijan, and Georgia, and the territory of Ukraine, Iraq, Jordan and Syria lying outside these limits are included in the European Broadcasting Area.

Eligibility to participate in the contest is therefore not limited to countries in Europe, as several states geographically outside the boundaries of the continent or which span more than one continent are included in the Broadcasting Area. Countries from these groups have taken part in past editions, including countries in Western Asia such as Israel and Cyprus, countries which span Europe and Asia like Russia and Turkey, and North African countries such as Morocco. Australia became the first country to participate from outside the European Broadcasting Area in 2015, following an invitation by the contest's Reference Group.

EBU members who wish to participate must fulfil conditions as laid down in the rules of the contest, a separate copy of which is drafted annually. A maximum of 44 countries can take part in any one contest. Broadcasters must have paid the EBU a participation fee in advance to the deadline specified in the rules for the year in which they wish to participate; this fee is different for each country based on its size and viewership.

Fifty-two countries have participated at least once. These are listed here alongside the year in which they made their debut:

Hosting 

The winning country traditionally hosts the following year's event, with some exceptions since . Hosting the contest can be seen as a unique opportunity for promoting the host country as a tourist destination and can provide benefits to the local economy and tourism sectors of the host city. Preparations for each year's contest typically begin at the conclusion of the previous year's contest, with the winning country's head of delegation receiving a welcome package of information related to hosting the contest at the winner's press conference. Eurovision is a non-profit event, and financing is typically achieved through a fee from each participating broadcaster, contributions from the host broadcaster and the host city, and commercial revenues from sponsorships, ticket sales, televoting and merchandise.

The host broadcaster will subsequently select a host city, typically a national or regional capital city, which must meet certain criteria set out in the contest's rules. The host venue must be able to accommodate at least 10,000 spectators, a press centre for 1,500 journalists, should be within easy reach of an international airport and with hotel accommodation available for at least 2,000 delegates, journalists and spectators. A variety of different venues have been used for past editions, from small theatres and television studios to large arenas and stadiums.

Eurovision logo and theme 

Until 2004, each edition of the contest used its own logo and visual identity as determined by the respective host broadcaster. This is typically accompanied by a unique theme artwork and slogan designed for each individual contest by the host broadcaster, with the flag of the host country placed prominently in the centre of the Eurovision heart. The original logo was designed by the London-based agency JM International, and received a revamp in 2014 by the Amsterdam-based Cityzen Agency for the contest's .

An individual slogan and theme has been associated with most editions of the contest since 2002, and is utilised by contest producers when constructing the show's visual identity, including the stage design, the opening and interval acts, and the "postcards". The short video postcards are interspersed between the entries and were first introduced in 1970, initially as an attempt to "bulk up" the contest after a number of countries decided not to compete, but has since become a regular part of the show and usually highlight the host country and introduce the competing acts.

Preparations 

Preparations in the host venue typically begin approximately six weeks before the final, to accommodate building works and technical rehearsals before the arrival of the competing artists. Delegations will typically arrive in the host city two to three weeks before the live show, and each participating broadcaster nominates a head of delegation, responsible for coordinating the movements of their delegation and being that country's representative to the EBU. Members of each country's delegation include performers, composers, lyricists, members of the press, and—in the years where a live orchestra was present—a conductor. Present if desired is a commentator, who provides commentary of the event for their country's radio and/or television feed in their country's own language in dedicated booths situated around the back of the arena behind the audience.

Each country conducts two individual rehearsals, the first for 30 minutes and held behind closed doors, and the second for 20 minutes and open to accredited press; the latter is used as a recorded back-up if the country's representative artist is unable to perform in later rehearsals or the live shows. Technical rehearsals for the semi-finalists commence the week before the live shows, with countries typically rehearsing in the order in which they will perform during the contest; rehearsals for the host country and the "Big Five" automatic finalists are held towards the end of the week. Following rehearsals, delegations meet with the show's production team to review footage of the rehearsal and raise any special requirements or changes. "Meet and greet" sessions and press conferences with accredited fans and press are held during these rehearsal weeks. Each live show is preceded by three dress rehearsals, where the whole show is run in the same way as it will be presented on TV. The second dress rehearsal, alternatively called the "jury show" and held the night before the broadcast, is used as a recorded back-up in case of technological failure, and performances during this show are used by each country's professional jury to determine their votes. The delegations from the qualifying countries in each semi-final attend a qualifiers' press conference after their respective semi-final, and the winning delegation attends a winners' press conference following the final.

A welcome reception is typically held at a venue in the host city on the Sunday preceding the live shows, which includes a red carpet ceremony for all the participating countries and is usually broadcast online. Accredited delegates, press and fans have access to an official nightclub, the "EuroClub", and some delegations will hold their own parties. The "Eurovision Village" is an official fan zone open to the public free of charge, with live performances by the contest's artists and screenings of the live shows on big screens.

Rules 

The contest is organised annually by the European Broadcasting Union (EBU), together with the participating broadcaster of the host country. The event is monitored by an Executive Supervisor appointed by the EBU, and by the Reference Group which represents all participating broadcasters, who are each represented by a nominated Head of Delegation. The current Executive Supervisor  is Martin Österdahl, who took over the role from Jon Ola Sand in May 2020. A detailed set of rules is written by the EBU for each contest and approved by the Reference Group. These rules have changed over time, and typically outline, among other points, the eligibility of the competing songs, the format of the contest, and the voting system to be used to determine the winner and how the results will be presented.

Song eligibility and languages 

All competing songs must have a duration of three minutes or less. This rule applies only to the version performed during the live shows. In order to be considered eligible, competing songs in a given year's contest must not have been released commercially before the first day of September of the previous year. All competing entries must include vocals and lyrics of some kind and purely instrumental pieces are not allowed. Competing entries may be performed in any language, be that natural or constructed, and participating broadcasters are free to decide the language in which their entry may be performed.

Rules specifying in which language a song may be performed have changed over time. No restrictions were originally enacted when the contest was first founded, however following criticism over the  being performed in English, a new rule was introduced for the  restricting songs to be performed only in an official language of the country it represented.

Artist eligibility and performances 

Currently the number of people permitted on stage during competing performances is limited to a maximum of six, and no live animals are allowed. Since , all contestants must be aged 16 or over on the day of the live show in which they perform. There is no limit on the nationality or country of birth of the competing artists, and participating broadcasters are free to select an artist from any country; several winning artists have subsequently held a different nationality or were born in a different country to that which they represented. No performer may compete for more than one country in a given year.

The orchestra was a prominent aspect of the contest from 1956 to 1998. Pre-recorded backing tracks were first allowed for competing acts in 1973, but any pre-recorded instruments were required to be seen being "performed" on stage; in 1997, all instrumental music was allowed to be pre-recorded, however the host country was still required to provide an orchestra. Currently all instrumental music for competing entries must now be pre-recorded, and no live instrumentation is allowed during performances.

The main vocals of competing songs must be performed live during the contest. Previously live backing vocals were also required; since  these may optionally be pre-recorded – this change has been implemented on a trial basis in an effort to introduce flexibility following the cancellation of the 2020 edition and to facilitate modernisation.

Running order 
Since , the order in which the competing countries perform has been determined by the contest's producers, and submitted to the EBU Executive Supervisor and Reference Group for approval before public announcement. This was changed from a random draw used in previous years in order to provide a better experience for television viewers and ensure all countries stand out by avoiding instances where songs of a similar style or tempo are performed in sequence.

Countries are placed into pots based on their geographical location and voting history in recent contests, and are assigned to compete in one of the two semi-finals through a random draw. Countries are then randomly assigned to compete in either the first or second half of their respective semi-final, and once all competing songs have been selected the producers then determine the running order for the semi-finals. The automatic qualifiers are assigned at random to a semi-final for the purposes of voting rights.

Semi-final qualifiers make a draw at random during the winners' press conference to determine whether they will perform during the first or second half of the final; the automatic finalists then randomly draw their competing half in the run-up to the final, except for the host country, whose exact performance position is determined in a separate draw. The running order for the final is then decided following the second semi-final by the producers. The running orders are decided with the competing songs' musical qualities, stage performance, prop and lighting set-up, and other production considerations taken into account.

Voting 

Starting in 2023, the voting system used to determine the results of the contest works on the basis of positional voting. Each country awards 1–8, 10 and 12 points to the ten favourite songs as voted for by that country's general public or assembled jury, with the most preferred song receiving 12 points. In the semi-finals, each country awards one set of points based primarily on the votes cast by that country's viewing public via telephone, SMS or the official Eurovision app, while in the final, each country awards two sets of points, with one set awarded each by the viewers and a jury panel comprising five music professionals from that country. Starting in 2023, viewers in selected non-participating countries are also able to vote during the contest, with those viewers able to cast votes via an online platform, which are then aggregated and awarded as one set of points from an "extra country" for the overall public vote. This system is a modification of that used since 1975, when the "12 points" system was first introduced but with one set of points per country, and a similar system used since 2016 where two sets of points were awarded in both the semi-finals and final. National juries and the public in each country are not allowed to vote for their own country, a rule first introduced in 1957.

Historically, each country's points were determined by a jury, consisting at various times of members of the public, music professionals, or both in combination. The mix of jury and public voting continues to be used in the final as of 2023.

Should two or more countries finish with the same number of points, a tie-break procedure is employed to determine the final placings.  a combined national televoting and jury result is calculated for each country, and the country which has obtained more points from the public voting following this calculation is deemed to have placed higher.

Presentation of the votes 

Since 1957, each country's votes have been announced during a special voting segment as part of the contest's broadcast, with a selected spokesperson assigned to announce the results of their country's vote. This spokesperson is typically well known in their country; previous spokespersons have included former Eurovision artists and presenters.

Scoring is done by both a national jury and a national televote. Each country's jury votes are consecutively added to the totals scoreboard as they are called upon by the contest presenter(s). The scoreboard was historically placed at the side of the stage and updated manually as each country gave their votes;  in  a computer graphics scoreboard was introduced. The jury points from 1–8 and 10 are displayed on screen and added automatically to the scoreboard, then the country's spokesperson announces which country will receive the 12 points. Once jury points from all countries have been announced, the presenter(s) announce the total public points received for each finalist, with the votes for each country being consolidated and announced as a single value. Since , the public points have been revealed in ascending order based on the jury vote, with the country that received the fewest points from the jury being the first to receive their public points. A full breakdown of the results across all shows is published on the official Eurovision website after the final, including each country's televoting ranking and the votes of its jury and individual jury members. Each country's individual televoting points in the final are typically displayed on-screen by that country's broadcaster following the announcement of the winner.

Broadcasting 
Participating broadcasters are required to air live the semi-final in which they compete, or in the case of the automatic finalists the semi-final in which they are required to vote, and the final, in its entirety; this includes all competing songs, the voting recap containing short clips of the performances, the voting procedure or semi-final qualification reveal, and the reprise of the winning song in the final. Since 1999, broadcasters who wished to do so were given the opportunity to provide advertising during short, non-essential hiatuses in the show's schedule. In exceptional circumstances, such as due to developing emergency situations, participating broadcasters may delay or postpone broadcast of the event. Should a broadcaster fail to air a show as expected in any other scenario they may be subject to sanctions by the EBU. Several broadcasters in countries that are unable to compete have previously aired the contest in their markets.

As national broadcasters join and leave the Eurovision feed transmitted by the EBU, the EBU/Eurovision network logo ident (not to be confused with the logo of the song contest itself) is displayed. The accompanying music (used on other Eurovision broadcasts) is the Prelude (Marche en rondeau) to Marc-Antoine Charpentier's Te Deum. Originally, the same logo was used for both the Eurovision network and the European Broadcasting Union, however, they now have two different logos; the latest Eurovision network logo was introduced in 2012, and when the ident is transmitted at the start and end of programmes it is this Eurovision network logo that appears.

The EBU now holds the recordings of all but two editions of the contest in its archives, following a project initiated in 2011 to collate footage and related materials of all editions ahead of the event's 60th edition in 2015. Although cameras were present to practice pan-European broadcasting for the first contest in 1956 to the few Europeans who had television sets, its audience was primarily over the radio. The only footage available is a Kinescope recording of Lys Assia's reprise of her winning song. No full recording of the  exists, with conflicting reports of the fate of any copies that may have survived. Audio recordings of both contests do however exist, and some short pieces of footage from both events have survived.

Expansion of the contest 

From the original seven countries which entered the first contest in 1956, the number of competing countries has steadily grown over time. 18 countries participated in the contest's tenth edition in 1965, and by 1990, 22 countries were regularly competing each year.

Besides slight modifications to the voting system and other contest rules, no fundamental changes to the contest's format were introduced until the early 1990s, when events in Europe in the late 1980s and early 1990s resulted in a growing interest from new countries in the former Eastern Bloc, particularly following the merger of the Eastern European rival OIRT network with the EBU in 1993.

Pre-selections and relegation 
29 countries registered to take part in the 1993 contest, a figure the EBU considered unable to fit reasonably into a single TV show. A preselection method was subsequently introduced for the first time in order to reduce the number of competing entries, with seven countries in Central and Eastern Europe participating in Kvalifikacija za Millstreet, held in Ljubljana, Slovenia one month before the event. A new relegation system was introduced for entry into the 1994 contest, with the lowest-placed countries being forced to sit out the following year's event to be replaced by countries which had not competed in the previous contest.

This was subsequently changed again in 2001, back to the same system used between 1993 and 1995 where only the results from that year's contest would count towards relegation.

The "Big Four" and "Big Five" 
In 1999, an exemption from relegation was introduced for France, Germany, Spain and the United Kingdom, giving them an automatic right to compete in the 2000 contest and in all subsequent editions. This group, as the highest-paying EBU members which significantly fund the contest each year, subsequently became known as the "Big Four" countries. This group was expanded in 2011 when Italy began competing again, becoming the "Big Five". Originally brought in to ensure that the financial contributions of the contest's biggest financial backers would not be missed, since the introduction of the semi-finals in 2004, the "Big Five" now instead automatically qualify for the final along with the host country.

There remains debate on whether this status prejudices the countries' results, based on reported antipathy over their automatic qualification and the potential disadvantage of having spent less time on stage through not competing in the semi-finals, however this status appears to be more complex given results of the "Big Five" countries can vary widely. This status has caused consternation from other competing countries, and was cited, among other aspects, as a reason why  had ceased participating after .

Introduction of semi-finals 

An influx of new countries applying for the  resulted in the introduction of a semi-final from 2004, with the contest becoming a two-day event. The top 10 countries in each year's final would qualify automatically to the following year's final, alongside the "Big Four", meaning all other countries would compete in the semi-final to compete for 10 qualification spots. The format of this semi-final remained similar to the final proper, taking place a few days before the final; following the performances and the voting window, the names of the 10 countries with the highest number of points, which would therefore qualify for the final, were announced at the end of the show, revealed in a random order by the contest's presenters.

Entries and participants 

The contest has been used as a launching point for artists who went on to achieve worldwide fame, and several of the world's best-selling artists are counted among past Eurovision Song Contest participants and winning artists. ABBA, the  winners for Sweden, have recorded an estimated 380 million albums and singles sales since their contest win brought them to worldwide attention, with their winning song "Waterloo" selling over five million records. Celine Dion's win for Switzerland in  helped launch her international career, particularly in the anglophone market, and she would go on to sell an estimated 200 million records worldwide. Australian singer Olivia Newton-John represented the United Kingdom in 1974, placing fourth behind ABBA, but went on to sell an estimated 100 million records, win four Grammy Awards, and star in the critically and commercially successful musical film Grease.

A number of performers have competed in the contest after having already achieved considerable success. These include winning artists Lulu, Toto Cutugno, and Katrina and the Waves, and acts that failed to win such as Nana Mouskouri, Cliff Richard, Baccara, Umberto Tozzi, Plastic Bertrand, t.A.T.u., Las Ketchup, Patricia Kaas, Engelbert Humperdinck, Bonnie Tyler, and Flo Rida. Many well-known composers and lyricists have penned entries of varying success over the years, including Serge Gainsbourg, Goran Bregović, Diane Warren, Andrew Lloyd Webber, Pete Waterman, and Tony Iommi, as well as producers Timbaland and Guy-Manuel de Homem-Christo.

Past participants have contributed to other fields in addition to their music careers. The Netherlands' Annie Schmidt, lyricist of the first entry performed at Eurovision, has gained a worldwide reputation for her stories and earned the Hans Christian Andersen Award for children's literature. French "yé-yé girls" Françoise Hardy and contest winner France Gall are household names of 1960s pop culture, with Hardy also being a pioneer of street style fashion trends and an inspiration for the global youthquake movement. Figures who carved a career in politics and gained international acclaim for humanitarian achievements include contest winner Dana as a two-time Irish presidential candidate and Member of the European Parliament (MEP); Nana Mouskouri as Greek MEP and a UNICEF international goodwill ambassador; contest winner Ruslana as member of Verkhovna Rada, Ukraine's parliament and a figure of the Orange Revolution and Euromaidan protests, who gained global honours for leadership and courage; and North Macedonia's Esma Redžepova as member of political parties and a two-time Nobel Peace Prize nominee.

Competing songs have occasionally gone on to become successes for their original performers and other artists, and some of the best-selling singles globally received their first international performances at Eurovision. "Nel blu, dipinto di blu", also known as "Volare", Italy's third-placed song in  performed by Domenico Modugno, is the only Eurovision entry to win a Grammy Award. It was the first Grammy winner for both Record of the Year and Song of the Year and it has since been recorded by various artists, topped the Billboard Hot 100 in the United States and achieved combined sales of over 22 million copies worldwide.

The turn of the century has also seen numerous competing songs becoming successes. Just a Little Bit" and the first Eurovision winning song since "Save Your Kisses for Me" to chart on the Billboard Hot 100, eventually peaking at #30. The  saw the next major breakthrough success from Eurovision, with Måneskin, that year's winners for Italy with "", attracting worldwide attention across their repertoire immediately following their victory.

Four further songwriters have each written two contest-winning songs: Willy van Hemert, Yves Dessca, Rolf Løvland, and Brendan Graham.

Winners 

Of the 52 countries to have taken part, 25 have yet to win. A majority of winning songs have been performed in English, particularly since the language rule was abolished in 1999. Since that contest, seven winning songs have been performed either fully or partially in a language other than English.

The United Kingdom holds the record for the highest number of second-place finishes, having come runner-up in the contest sixteen times. Meanwhile,  has come last more than any other country, appearing at the bottom of the scoreboard on eleven occasions, including scoring nul points four times.

The winning artists and songwriters receive a trophy, which since 2008 has followed a standard design: a handmade piece of sandblasted glass with painted details in the shape of a 1950s-style microphone, designed by Kjell Engman of the Swedish-based glassworks Kosta Boda. The trophy is typically presented by the previous year's winner; others who have handed out the award in the past include representatives from the host broadcaster or the EBU, and politicians; in 2007 the fictional character, Joulupukki (original Santa Claus from Finland), presented the award to the winner Marija Šerifović.

Interval acts and guest appearances 

Alongside the song contest and appearances from local and international personalities, performances from non-competing artists and musicians have been included since the first edition, and have become a staple of the live show. These performances have varied widely, previously featuring music, art, dance and circus performances, and past participants are regularly invited to perform, with the reigning champion traditionally returning each year to perform the previous year's winning song.

The contest's opening performance and the main interval act, held following the final competing song and before the announcement of the voting results, has become a memorable part of the contest and has included both internationally known artists and local stars. Riverdance, which later became one of the most successful dance productions in the world, first began as the interval performance at the 1994 contest in Ireland; the seven-minute performance of traditional Irish music and dance was later expanded into a full stage show that has been seen by over 25 million people worldwide and provided a launchpad for its lead dancers Michael Flatley and Jean Butler.

Other notable artists, including Cirque du Soleil, Alexandrov Ensemble, Vienna Boys' Choir ( and ) and Fire of Anatolia, also performed on the Eurovision stage, and there have been guest appearances from well-known faces from outside the world of music, including actors, athletes, and serving astronauts and cosmonauts. Guest performances have been used as a channel in response to global events happening concurrently with the contest. The  in Israel closed with all competing acts performing a rendition of Israel's  winning song "Hallelujah" as a tribute to the victims of the war in the Balkans, a dance performance entitled "The Grey People" in 2016's first semi-final was devoted to the European migrant crisis, and the  featured known anti-war songs "Fragile", "People Have the Power" and "Give Peace a Chance" in response to the Russian invasion of Ukraine that same year.

Criticism and controversy 
The contest has been the subject of considerable criticism regarding both its musical content and what has been reported to be a political element to the event, and several controversial moments have been witnessed over the course of its history.

Musical style and presentation 
Criticism has been levied against the musical quality of past competing entries, with a perception that certain music styles seen as being presented more often than others in an attempt to appeal to as many potential voters as possible among the international audience. Power ballads, folk rhythms and bubblegum pop have been considered staples of the contest in recent years, leading to allegations that the event has become formulaic. Other traits in past competing entries which have regularly been mocked by media and viewers include an abundance of key changes and lyrics about love and/or peace, as well as the pronunciation of English by non-native users of the language. Given Eurovision is principally a television show, over the years competing performances have attempted to attract the viewers' attention through means other than music, and elaborate lighting displays, pyrotechnics, and extravagant on-stage theatrics and costumes having become a common sight at recent contests; criticism of these tactics have been levied as being a method of distracting the viewer from the weak musical quality of some of the competing entries.

While many of these traits are ridiculed in the media and elsewhere, for others these traits are celebrated and considered an integral part of what makes the contest appealing. Although many of the competing acts each year will fall into some of the categories above, the contest has seen a diverse range of musical styles in its history, including rock, heavy metal, jazz, country, electronic, R&B, hip hop and avant-garde.

Political controversies 

As artists and songs ultimately represent a country, the contest has seen several controversial moments where political tensions between competing countries as a result of frozen conflicts, and in some cases open warfare, are reflected in the performances and voting.

Conflicts between the two countries at Eurovision escalated quickly since both countries began competing in the late 2000s, resulting in fines and disciplinary action for both countries' broadcasters over political stunts, and a forced change of title for one competing song due to allegations of political subtext. Russia eventually pulled out of the contest after offers for Samoylova to perform remotely were refused by Russia's broadcaster, Channel One Russia, resulting in the EBU reprimanding the Ukrainian broadcaster, UA:PBC. After requests by the EBU for changes to the lyrics were refused, Georgia's broadcaster GPB subsequently withdrew from the event.

's first win in  proved controversial for Arab states broadcasting the contest which would typically cut to advertisements when Israel performed due to a lack of recognition of the country, and when it became apparent Israel would win many of these broadcasters cut the feed before the end of the voting. Arab states which are eligible to compete have declined to participate due to Israel's presence, with  the only Arab state to have entered Eurovision, competing for the first, and  the only time, in  when Israel was absent. Others campaigned against a boycott, asserting that any cultural boycott would be antithetical to advancing peace in the region.

Political and geographical voting 

The contest has been described as containing political elements in its voting process, a perception that countries will give votes more frequently and in higher quantities to other countries based on political relationships, rather than the musical merits of the songs themselves. Numerous studies and academic papers have been written on this subject, which have corroborated that certain countries form "clusters" or "cliques" by frequently voting in the same way; one study concludes that voting blocs can play a crucial role in deciding the winner of the contest, with evidence that on at least two occasions bloc voting was a pivotal factor in the vote for the winning song. Other views on these "blocs" argue that certain countries will allocate high points to others based on similar musical tastes, shared cultural links and a high degree of similarity and mutual intelligibility between languages, and are therefore more likely to appreciate and vote for the competing songs from these countries based on these factors, rather than political relationships specifically.

Voting patterns in the contest have been reported by news publishers, including The Economist and BBC News. Criticism of the voting system was at its highest in the mid-2000s, resulting in a number of calls for countries to boycott the contest over reported voting biases, particularly following the  where Eastern European countries occupied the top 15 places in the final and dominated the qualifying spaces.

LGBT visibility 

Eurovision has had a long-held fan base in the LGBT community, and contest organisers have actively worked to include these fans in the event since the 1990s. In , Nikkie de Jager became the first trans person to host the contest.

Past competing songs and performances have included references and allusions to same-sex relationships; "Nous les amoureux", the  winning song, contained references to the difficulties faced by a homosexual relationship; Krista Siegfrids' performance of "Marry Me" at the  included a same-sex kiss with one of her female backing dancers; and the stage show of 's Ryan O'Shaughnessy's "Together" in  had two male dancers portraying a same-sex relationship. Drag performers, such as 's Verka Serduchka, 's DQ and 's Sestre, have appeared, including Wurst winning in 2014.

In more recent years, various political ideologies across Europe have clashed in the Eurovision setting, particularly on LGBT rights. Dana International's selection for the 1998 contest in Birmingham was marked by objections and death threats from orthodox religious sections of Israeli society, and at the contest her accommodation was reportedly in the only hotel in Birmingham with bulletproof windows. LGBT visibility in the contest has been cited as a deciding factor for 's non-participation since , although no official reason was given by the Hungarian broadcaster MTVA. The rise of anti-LGBT sentiment in Europe has led to a marked increase in booing from contest audiences, particularly since the introduction of a "gay propaganda" law in Russia in 2013. Conchita Wurst's win was met with criticism on the Russian political stage, with several conservative politicians voicing displeasure in the result.

Cultural influence 
The Eurovision Song Contest has amassed a global following and sees annual audience figures of between 100 million and 600 million. The contest has become a cultural influence worldwide since its first years, is regularly described as having kitsch appeal, and is included as a topic of parody in television sketches and in stage performances at the Edinburgh Fringe and Melbourne Comedy festivals among others. Several films have been created which celebrate the contest, including Eytan Fox's 2013 Israeli comedy Cupcakes, and the Netflix 2020 musical comedy, Eurovision Song Contest: The Story of Fire Saga, produced with backing from the EBU and starring Will Ferrell and Rachel McAdams.

Eurovision has a large online following and multiple independent websites, news blogs and fan clubs are dedicated to the event. One of the oldest and largest Eurovision fan clubs is OGAE, founded in 1984 in Finland and currently a network of over 40 national branches across the world. National branches regularly host events to promote and celebrate Eurovision, and several participating broadcasters work closely with these branches when preparing their entries.

In the run-up to each year's contest, several countries regularly host smaller events between the conclusion of the national selection shows in March and the contest proper in May, known as the "pre-parties". These events typically feature the artists which will go on to compete at that year's contest, and consist of performances at a venue and meet-and-greets with fans and the press. Eurovision in Concert, held annually in Amsterdam, was one of the first of these events to be created, holding its first edition in 2008. Other events held regularly include the London Eurovision Party, PrePartyES in Madrid, and Israel Calling in Tel Aviv. Several community events have been held virtually, particularly since the outbreak of the COVID-19 pandemic in Europe in 2020. EurovisionAgain, an initiative where fans watched and discussed past contests in sync on YouTube and other social media platforms, was launched during the first COVID-19 lockdowns and subsequently became a top trend on Twitter across Europe, catching the attention of Eurovision organisers who began to broadcast the contests through their official YouTube channel. Through the EBU, the initiative was able to secure the rights to show several older editions for the first time on their YouTube channel, and over £20,000 was raised for UK-based LGBTQ+ charities.

Special events and related competitions 

Several anniversary events, and related contests under the "Eurovision Live Events" brand, have been organised by the EBU with member broadcasters. In addition participating broadcasters have occasionally commissioned special Eurovision programmes for their home audiences, and a number of other imitator contests have been developed outside of the EBU framework, on both a national and international level.

The EBU has held several events to mark selected anniversaries in the contest's history: Songs of Europe, held in 1981 to celebrate its twenty-fifth anniversary, had live performances and video recordings of all Eurovision Song Contest winners up to 1981; Congratulations: 50 Years of the Eurovision Song Contest was organised in 2005 to celebrate the event's fiftieth anniversary, and featured a contest to determine the most popular song from among 14 selected entries from the contest's first 50 years; and in 2015 the event's sixtieth anniversary was marked by Eurovision Song Contest's Greatest Hits, a concert of performances by past Eurovision artists and video montages of performances and footage from previous contests.

The Eurovision Dance Contest was an event featuring pairs of dancers performing ballroom and Latin dancing, which took place for two editions, in 2007 and 2008.

Similar international music competitions have been organised externally to the EBU. The Sopot International Song Festival has been held annually since 1961; between 1977 and 1980, under the patronage of the International Radio and Television Organisation (OIRT), an Eastern European broadcasting network similar to the EBU, it was rebranded as the Intervision Song Contest. An Ibero-American contest, the OTI Festival, was previously held among hispanophone and lusophone countries in Europe, North America and South America; and a contest for countries and autonomous regions with Turkic links, the Turkvision Song Contest, has been organised since 2013. Similarly, an adaption of the contest for artists in the United States, the American Song Contest, was first held in 2022 and featured songs representing U.S. states and territories. Adaptions of the contest for artists in Canada and Latin America are in development.

References 

Sources:

Further reading

External links 

 
 
 

 
1956 establishments in Europe
Song Contest
Music television series
Pop music festivals
Recurring events established in 1956
Song contests
Annual television shows